Folk the World Tour is the debut live album by New Zealand comedy folk band Flight of the Conchords. Self-released on 14 November 2002, the album was recorded at two shows in New Zealand, in April 2001 at the BATS Theatre in Wellington and in May 2002 at The Classic in Auckland. The album also includes two studio tracks, "Hotties" and "Frodo", recorded in June 2002 at Cable Street Studio in Wellington.

Track listing

Personnel
Flight of the Conchords
Jemaine Clement – vocals, acoustic guitar, production
Bret McKenzie – vocals, acoustic guitar, production
Additional musical personnel
Adrian Pryor – electric guitar
Stephen Jessup – lap steel guitar
Tim Jaray – bass, double bass
Paul Hoskins – drums
Chris Yeabsley – keyboards
Toby Laing – synthesizers, trumpet
Nigel Collins – cello
Andrew Johnson – didgeridoo
Production personnel
Michael Cole – engineering on tracks 1, 2, 3, 4, 5, 8 and 9
Tristan Nelson-Hauer – engineering on tracks 1, 2, 3, 4, 5, 8 and 9
Lee Prebble – engineering on tracks 6, 7 and 10
Mike Gibson – mastering

References

Flight of the Conchords albums
2002 debut albums
2002 live albums
Self-released albums
2000s comedy albums